Brinley "Bryn" Phillips (11 October 1900 – 6 May 1980) was a Welsh dual-code international rugby union and professional rugby league footballer who played in the 1920s.

Background
Phillips was born in Merthyr Tydfil, Wales, and he died aged  79–80 in Neath, Wales.

Playing career

International honours
Bryn Phillips won caps for Wales (RU) while at Aberavon RFC in 1925 against England, Scotland, France, and Ireland, and in 1926 against England, and won a cap for Wales (RL) while at Huddersfield in 1926.

County honours
Bryn Phillips played right-, i.e. number 12, and scored a try in Glamorgan's 18–14 victory over Monmouthshire in the non-County Championship match during the 1926–27 season at Taff Vale Park, Pontypridd on Saturday 30 April 1927.

References

External links
Search for "Brynley Phillips" at britishnewspaperarchive.co.uk
Search for "Brinley Phillips" at britishnewspaperarchive.co.uk
Search for "Bryn Phillips" at britishnewspaperarchive.co.uk

1900 births
1980 deaths
Aberavon RFC players
Glamorgan Police officers
Dual-code rugby internationals
Glamorgan Police RFC players
Glamorgan rugby league team players
Huddersfield Giants players
Rugby league locks
Rugby league players from Merthyr Tydfil
Rugby league second-rows
Rugby union locks
Rugby union players from Merthyr Tydfil
Taibach RFC players
Wales international rugby union players
Wales national rugby league team players
Welsh police officers
Welsh rugby league players
Welsh rugby union players